This article is a list of the episodes of Hana no Ko Lunlun, an anime series based on the manga series by the same name. The original story was created by Shiro Jinbo. The anime adaptation is created by Toei Animation. The series began airing in Japan on February 9, 1979 on the TV Asahi network.

Hana no Ko Lunlun